Judy Marte is an American actress who can be seen in films such as Raising Victor Vargas and On the Outs. She is best known for her roles as rookie officer Tonya Sanchez in the short lived CBS drama NYC 22 and Wanda in Netflix original The Get Down.

Career 
Judy got her start at the age of 15 when she auditioned for the short film Five Feet High and Rising by the then-unknown Pete Sollett in 2000. Eventually it evolved into the critically acclaimed Raising Victor Vargas, earning Marte her first Independent Spirit Award nomination for Best Debut Performance. She followed that performance with On the Outs, receiving her second Independent Spirit Award nomination for Best Female Lead. Her recent film credits include Maria My Love directed by Jasmine McGlade Chazelle (accepted into the Tribeca Film Festival) and The Mortician directed by Gareth Maxwell Roberts (accepted into the Berlin Film Festival.) Her television credits include guest starring roles on CSI: Miami, on the Network, and Law & Order: Trial by Jury.  She is best known for her role as Tonya Sanchez in the 2012 police drama NYC 22.

Filmography

Awards and nominations

References

External links 

1983 births
Living people
Actresses from New York City
American film actresses
American people of Dominican Republic descent
American television actresses
Hispanic and Latino American actresses
21st-century American women